Helvetia is a census-designated place (CDP) in Randolph County, West Virginia, United States. As of the 2010 census, its population was 59. According to the 2020 census, its population was 38. The isolated community was settled by Swiss starting in 1869, and is known today for maintaining Swiss traditions, food, and folkways.

History 

After the end of the Civil War, a group of Swiss and German-speaking immigrants calling themselves the Grütliverein (Grütli Society) formed in Brooklyn, New York. The members agreed that they would all emigrate to another section of the country together when the time was right.

A member of the society named Isler surveyed large swaths of the eastern West Virginia mountains for a Washington-based firm, and reported back to the society on the richness of the country. A committee of six men was assembled, and left Brooklyn by rail on October 15, 1869. They arrived at Clarksburg and began the difficult work of traveling by foot over the mountains.

They reached a plot that was on offer for sale on October 20, and were disappointed by the extreme thickness of the wilderness in this lightly settled and rugged country. The land was very reasonably priced, though, and they had offers of other assistance from the land agents in Clarksburg if they would encourage further settlement in the area. After hearing the report of this exploration, the society members all decided they would go to West Virginia.

Because of the low cost of the land, all of the settlers were able to buy their own tracts, ranging from a small house lot to hundreds of acres.

At the beginning of 1871, there were thirty-two people living in the community. A new arrival in that year, C.E. Lutz, became the local land agent and wrote advertisements in English and German for papers across the country extolling the virtues of the settlement. Lutz's methods would later face scrutiny from both American and Swiss authorities, and he would be investigated in 1880 by West Virginia State Senator Joseph J. Woods. 

New settlers came from various parts of the United States and Canada, and some immigrated directly from Switzerland. In addition to farmers and herdsmen, many craftsmen and professionals were among the settlers: stonemasons; carpenters; painters; wagon, shoe, watch, hat, and cheese makers; musicians; teachers; ministers; and doctors. By 1874 the community's population had grown to a heady 308, and by 1875 a band and mutual aid society called the Schweizer-Kranken-Unterstützung-Verein (or, the Swiss Health Support Association) had been organized.

During the late 1960s, Eleanor Mailloux and Delores Baggerly worked to attract tourists to the town by highlighting the town's Swiss heritage. They established the Hütte restaurant, collaborated on a community cookbook titled Oppis Guet’s vo Helvetia, and began the public annual Fasnacht celebration. Notably, Helvetia's Fasnacht combines the customs of the traditional Swiss Fasnacht and Sechselaüten.

The Helvetia Village Historic District was listed on the National Register of Historic Places in 1978.

Helvetia is a playable location in the 2018 video game Fallout 76, which is set in the state of West Virginia and is the staging ground of the popular Fasnacht day event in Fallout 76.

Events and festivals 
Fasnacht, last Saturday before Lent
West Virginia Maple Syrup Festival, third Weekend in March
Helvetia Ramp Supper, last Saturday in April
Follow Your Bliss Festival, weekend after Father's Day
Swiss National Holiday, Saturday nearest August 1
Helvetia Community Fair, second full weekend in September
Thanksgiving Dinner, Fourth Thursday in November
Feast of Saint Nicholas Day, Saturday closest to December 5

References

External links 

Helvetia WV News
Photo Documentary of Helvetia West Virginia Community from SamandaDorger.com

Census-designated places in Randolph County, West Virginia
Census-designated places in West Virginia
German-American culture in West Virginia
Swiss-American culture in West Virginia
Populated places established in 1869
1869 establishments in West Virginia